Ana Cecilia Noguez Garrido  (born July 17, 1966) is a Mexican physicist, professor, and science communicator; she is researcher and director of the Institute of Physics of the National Autonomous University of Mexico. Cecilia Noguez specializes in the interaction of light with matter on a nanometric scale. In 2016, she was awarded with the National Prize for Arts and Sciences.

Education and early career
In May 1990, Ana Cecilia Noguez obtained her bachelor degree in Physics at the Faculty of Sciences of the National Autonomous University of Mexico (UNAM). Since then, she has been working with the optical properties of mediums composed of nanoparticles. In 1993 and 1995, she obtained a master's degree and a doctorate in physics, respectively, also at UNAM. As part of her PhD, Noguez spent a research stay for over one year at the University of Rome II. From July 1995 to 1996, she had a postdoctoral residency at Ohio University's Department of Physics and Astronomy. During her PhD, she also studied the optical response of semiconductor crystal surfaces.

Career
In 1996, Cecilia Noguez joined the Institute of Physics of UNAM, where she continues to work today. She was designated as director of the Institute of Physics for the period 2019-2023, becoming the first woman to hold the position. Along with her research work, Cecilia Noguez teaches in both undergraduate and graduate programs at UNAM.

Noguez has conducted theoretical and computational research to study the interaction between light and matter at the nanometer scale. Particularly, she has made contributions in order to understand how the geometry, size, composition, and the medium surrounding a nanoparticle influence its optical properties. Her work is mainly concentrated in areas such as plasmonics and surface physics. Her studies have contributed to the development of plasmonic nanostructures and two-dimensional films for the control of their optical activity. Noguez's scientific contributions to the study of optical properties and surface plasmons of metallic nanoparticles had been recognized in different occasion. For example, her work tittled “Surface Plasmons on Metal Nanoparticles:  The Influence of Shape and Physical Environment”, published on the Journal of Physical Chemistry C, was recognized as the Mexican paper in physics written by one author with more cites.

Cecilia Noguez has dedicated part of her trajectory to promote nanoscience in Mexico; she was part of the organization of the first network of nanoscience at UNAM (REGINA). Besides, she contributed to establish the Nanoscience Division of the Physical Mexican Society and the National Network of Nanoscience and Nanotechnology of CONACYT. She has also participated in activities aimed to promote science among general public. In 2018, she participated as a mentor for the initiative "Niñas STEM, pueden" (STEM Girls, They Can).

Awards and distinctions
 1996: Gabino Barreda Medal in the UNAM doctorate program
 1996: Weizmann Award for PhD thesis from the Mexican Academy of Sciences
 2006: UNAM Distinction for Young Academics
 2009: Research Award in Exact Sciences from the Mexican Academy of Sciences
 2009: Thomson Reuters/CINVESTAV Award
 2010: Heberto Castillo Martínez Capital City Award from the government of Mexico City
 2016: National Prize for Arts and Sciences in Natural Sciences
 2018: Honorary doctorate from UAEM

Selected publications

References

External links
 Cecilia Noguez at UNAM

1966 births
21st-century Mexican physicists
Living people
Members of the Mexican Academy of Sciences
Mexican women physicists
National Autonomous University of Mexico alumni
Academic staff of the National Autonomous University of Mexico
Scientists from Mexico City
Science communicators